Football at the 1951 Asian Games was held in New Delhi, India from 5 to 11 March 1951. In this tournament, six teams played in the men's competition. The pitch dimensions were 110 by 65 yards slightly narrower than permitted by international regulations but FIFA had been notified this in advance and sanctioned the tournament.

Medalists

Draw 
The draw for the Games was held on 25 February 1951 at a conference chaired by Guru Dutt Sondhi, who headed an executive committee for the purpose, in New Delhi. Japan and Afghanistan received byes in the first round; the former would play the winner of Iran v. Burma and the latter to play the winner of India v. Indonesia games. It was also announced that the matches would be played in two halves of 30 minutes each with a 5-minute interval, and a 15 minute extra-time with a 1-minute interval, when a result is not produced in regulation time.

Squads

Results 
All times are India Standard Time (UTC+05:00)

Quarterfinals

Semifinals

Replay

Bronze medal match

Gold medal match

Goalscorers

Final standing

References

External links 
 Report of the first Asian Games held at New Delhi

 
1951 Asian Games events
1951
Asia Games tournament
Asian Games 1951